Astar may refer to:

 Astar (god), astral god
 Astar, a New Zealand news presenter
 Astar (game), two-player abstract strategy board game
 Shay Astar (born 1981), an actress
 ASTAR, a c. 1980s fictional humanoid robot from Planet Danger created by The War Amps
 Astar Air Cargo, an American cargo airline based in Miami, Florida
 Eurocopter AS350 AStar helicopter
 A* search algorithm, a search algorithm for graphs
 ASTAR (company) a Spanish firearms company
 Agency for Science, Technology and Research, a statutory board of Singapore

See also
 Ashtar (disambiguation)
 A* (disambiguation)